BankPlus Amphitheater at Snowden Grove, formerly Snowden Grove Amphitheater, is a concert venue located at Snowden Grove Park in Southaven, Mississippi, a suburb of Memphis, Tennessee.  Opened in 2006, the amphitheater features 9,800 fixed seats, with a lawn area able to accommodate 850 additional spectators.

Name change 
In late 2014, BankPlus purchased the naming rights for Snowden Grove Amphitheater. The amphitheater's name changed to the BankPlus Amphitheater at Snowden Grove, effective January 1, 2015.

Featured acts 
 Dave Matthews Band
 Kenny Chesney
 Jason Aldean
 ZZ Top
 Velvet Revolver
 Trace Adkins
 Poison
 Lynyrd Skynyrd
 Blues Traveler
 Seether
 Willie Nelson
 Eric Church
 Brantley Gilbert
 Dierks Bentley
 Sugarland 
 Miranda Lambert
 Lady Antebellum
 Florida Georgia Line
 Train
 Goo Goo Dolls
 Journey
 Weezer

See also
 List of contemporary amphitheatres

References

Southaven, Mississippi
Amphitheaters in the United States
Music venues in Mississippi
Buildings and structures in DeSoto County, Mississippi